The following is a list of churches in West Devon.

Active churches
The district has an estimated 99 active churches for 54,600 people, a ratio of one church to every 552 inhabitants.

The only civil parishes without active churches are Bradstone, Okehampton Hamlets and Whitchurch.

Defunct churches

References 

West Devon
Churches